Hamlet Israel Barrientos Ferrufino (born 9 January 1978 in La Paz) is a Bolivian retired footballer who played as a goalkeeper.

Club career
He last played for Universitario de Sucre in the Bolivian First Division.

International career
Barrientos was a non-playing squad member of the Bolivia national football team at the 2001 Copa América.

References

External links

goal

1978 births
Living people
Footballers from La Paz
Bolivian footballers
Bolivia international footballers
Association football goalkeepers
2001 Copa América players
The Strongest players
Club San José players
Club Real Potosí players
C.D. Jorge Wilstermann players
Universitario de Sucre footballers